The Cupa României is a rugby union cup competition for Romanian teams which has been held annually since 1914 except for a couple of years where the cup was not held either because of World War II or other unknown reasons. It is the country's main cup competition, although not being open to all clubs affiliated with the Federaţia Română de Rugby (FRR) like in previous editions and only being open to the teams competing in the CEC Bank SuperLiga. In late March, it was announced that Tomitanii Constanța would not participate in the Cupa României for the 2021 season due to financial reasons.

History
The Cupa României, like the SuperLiga was set up in 1914 as the main cup competition in Romania and was only competed by two teams which were Tennis Club Român and Sporting Club, both from București. This two team competition continued until the 1920s and 1930s where the number of clubs in the capital had increased due to the popularity of the tournament in the capital especially. But the Cupa României was cancelled again (after the first two time in 1917 and 1918 which was due to World War One), in 1940 and 1942 because of the second World War caused by Nazi Germany at the time. After the war had ended, the birth of eternal rivals CSA Steaua Bucuresti and CS Dinamo București had arrived, consequently meaning the Cupa României was being dominated by the militarii (military) and poliţişti (police) respectively during the 1950s era with only one side standing in both of their ways, which was Energia ISP București.

However, despite the growth of interest from Romanian fans in the Cupa României, it was not held between 1960 and 1972 for unknown reasons yet during this time, Stadiul Român along with seventeen more teams were founded in București-only while out side of the capital, teams were being founded finally after years of rugby being dominant in București. In the 1980s and 1990s, the Cupa României started to become more national in terms of the fact that teams like Știința Petroșani, Rulmentul Bârlad, Farul Constanța and Sibiu were winning the cup and beating most of the teams in București with style and grace.

In recent years although, the Cupa României has been restricted to teams in the SuperLiga only instead of being open to all teams in Romania possibly in an attempt to improve the standard of the game in the whole country after the collapse of communism in Romania back in 1989 where the number of clubs and players had decreased significantly in the aftermath. The current champions of the Cupa României are CSA Steaua Bucuresti who beat SCM Timișoara in a close 25–23 game in December 2022.

Teams

Note: Flags indicate national union as has been defined under WR eligibility rules. Players may hold more than one non-WR nationality

Champions

Winners by year

See also
 Rugby union in Romania

Notes

External links
 Cupa României history

Rugby union competitions in Romania
1914 establishments in Romania